The AC Hotel Bella Sky Copenhagen, formerly the Bella Sky Comwell Hotel, is a 4-star conference hotel adjacent to the Bella Convention and Congress Center in the Ørestad district of Copenhagen, Denmark. With 814 rooms, it is the largest hotel in Scandinavia. The hotel joined the AC Hotels division of Marriott International on December 15, 2014.

Architecture
The hotel is designed by 3XN and consists of two towers which reach 76.5 metres up with an inclination of 15° in opposite directions. The height was determined by restrictions due to the proximity of Copenhagen Airport and the tilting design chosen to optimize views.

Ramboll was consulting engineer on structures, sewers and earthworks. All calculations and drawings used by Ramboll on the project were extracted from a 3D model. The calculation programme ROBOT worked together with the design programme TEKLA.

Facilities
The hotel has five restaurants, 30 meeting rooms and an 850 sq m wellness area. The 17th floor is specially designed for women, but also welcomes men. The Bella Sky Bar is situated on the 23rd floor.

Gallery

See also
 Inclined building

References

Hotels in Copenhagen
Hotels established in 2011
Hotel buildings completed in 2011
3XN buildings
Inclined buildings
Twin towers
Skyscrapers in Denmark
Skyscraper hotels